Hardinge Park officially known as Shaheed Veer Kunwar Singh Azadi Park is a public park in the city of Patna built by British Raj in 1916. The park was initially named after Viceroy Charles Hardinge and was built in his honour as he was instrumental in the creation of Bihar as a separate province. It was built as Patna's first public park. The park is located midway between Patna Junction and the Bihar Secretariat. The name was changed to Shaheed Veer Kunwar Singh Azadi Park post independence. The park also hosted a garden party for then Prince of Wales - Edward VIII - in 1921 on his visit to Patna. The park completed its centenary in 2016. It is known as the old bus stand. Indian Railways is soon going to construct Suburban Rail Terminal at Hardinge Park which is  barely 900 metres west from Patna Junction.

History
On 28 September 1913, the Hardinge Memorial Committee was constituted by state authorities to design and set up a park in Patna. A deed of grant was signed between the Patna collector and the Hardinge Memorial Committee on 8 September 1915 for development of a public park as Hardinge Park to be maintained by the committee. The Park was officially opened to the public on 31 January 1916 by the then Lieutenant-Governor of Bihar and Orissa, Edward Albert Gait. It was built in honour of Charles Hardinge, 1st Baron Hardinge of Penshurst and was named after him.

At the opening of the Park Lt Governor had also unveiled a 5 tonne life-size bronze statue of Lord Hardinge. The statue was created by renowned British sculptor Herbert Hampton in London. After protests in late 1960s the statue was removed from the park and placed in Patna Museum.  It was installed again in the 1990s on a platform in a corner of the Patna Museum's lawns. In late 2017, one of the last remnants of the British Raj-era landmark - the pedestal on which the Hardinge's iconic bronze statue once stood, was also demolished.

The park was also the location of Garden party for then Prince of Wales - Edward VIII - during his Patna visit in 1921. The party was hosted by Bihar Landholders' Association led by Maharaja of Darbhanga.

The park is one of the oldest parks in the city of Patna. The name of the park was changed to Shaheed Veer Kunwar Singh Azadi Park after Kunwar Singh who was a notable leader during the Indian Rebellion of 1857. The park used to be the location of Flower Shows in Patna for many years.

Design and Location
The park is located on north of Hardinge Road and Delhi-Howrah railway line in east–west direction. It is spread over an area of 22 acres and is somewhat triangular in shape. The park is dotted with ornamental fountains and perpendicular pathways are present across the area of the park.

Suburban Rail Terminal
The park has not been well maintained by the government and is in a state of neglect. It was recently being used as a land fill and garbage dump by the municipal corporation. Bihar Government plans to redevelop the park as a model park. The plan includes recreational facilities like toy train, musical fountains and a small boating space. Sporting facilities in its adjoining open area is also on the plan.

Indian Railways is going to build four platforms on the Hardinge Park side of Patna junction to facilitate smooth running of mainline-electric-multiple-unit (MEMU) trains. There will be  two pairs of double-discharge (DD) platform. Indian Railways has proposed to terminate and originate all its local passenger trains from the DD platforms.

See also
Patna–Digha Ghat line
Mithapur, Patna
Chennai Suburban Terminal
Patna Junction railway station
Coronation Park, Delhi

References

Gardens in India
Parks in Patna
Urban public parks
1916 establishments in India
History of Patna